Rhinophloeus is a genus of beetles in the family Laemophloeidae, containing the following species:

 Rhinophloeus elegans Grouvelle
 Rhinophloeus facetus Grouvelle
 Rhinophloeus gracilis Sharp
 Rhinophloeus nasutus Sharp
 Rhinophloeus productus Grouvelle
 Rhinophloeus salpingoides Grouvelle

References

Laemophloeidae
Cucujoidea genera